Lycée Paul Lapie is a French senior high school/sixth-form college in Courbevoie, Hauts-de-Seine, France, in the Paris metropolitan area.

The school building, designed by Florent Nanquette, opened in the fall of 1933. The school's design plans had been made in 1930.

References

External links
 Lycée Paul Lapie 

Lycées in Hauts-de-Seine
1933 establishments in France
Educational institutions established in 1933